Krasnoarmeysky District is an administrative and municipal district (raion), one of the twenty-two in Primorsky Krai, Russia. It is located in the center of the krai and borders with Pozharsky District in the northwest and north, Terneysky District in the east, the territory of Dalnegorsk Town Under Krai Jurisdiction in the south, and with Dalnerechensky District in the southwest and west. Its administrative center is the rural locality (a selo) of Novopokrovka. Population:  The population of Novopokrovka accounts for 19.7% of the district's total population.

Geography
The main rivers in the district are the Bolshaya Ussurka and the Armu. The Sikhote-Alin Nature Reserve is located in the east of the district.

Climate
The climate conditions of Krasnoarmeysky District sharply differ from those on the coast. The Sikhote-Alin mountain range is a natural barrier which blocks the penetration of the monsoonal winds from the south and the east, forming a specific microclimate of the district. Despite the climate conditions, however, the population of the district grows apples, plums, cherries, and watermelons.

Economy
Tungsten and timber, fur and gold are produced in the district. The Primorsky Ore Mining and Processing Enterprise operates here.

Media
The Sikhote-Alin newspaper is published in the district.

Notable residents 

Nikolai Stasenko (born 1987 in Roshchino), Belarusian ice hockey player

References

Notes

Sources

Districts of Primorsky Krai